Eric N. "E. J." Henderson (born August 3, 1980) is a former American football linebacker who played nine seasons for the Minnesota Vikings of the National Football League (NFL). He was drafted by the Vikings in the second round of the 2003 NFL Draft. He played college football at Maryland, where he was twice recognized as a consensus All-American.

Early years
Henderson was born in Fort Campbell, Kentucky.  He attended Aberdeen High School in Aberdeen, Maryland, where he played high school football for the Aberdeen Eagles.

College career
Henderson accepted an athletic scholarship to attend the University of Maryland, where he played for the Maryland Terrapins football team from 1999 to 2002.  He holds three NCAA records: career total tackles per game (12.5), season unassisted tackles with 135 in 2002, and career unassisted tackles per game (8.8).  He was recognized twice as a first-team ACC selection (2001, 2002), twice as the ACC Defensive Player of the Year (2001, 2002), and twice as a consensus first-team All-American (2000, 2001).  As a junior in 2001, he was honored as the ACC Player of the Year.  As a senior in 2002, he was the recipient of the Chuck Bednarik Award and Butkus Award, recognizing him as the best college defensive player and best college linebacker, respectively, in America.  He was also selected as the defensive most valuable player in the Terrapins' 30–3 victory over the Tennessee Volunteers in the 2002 Chick-fil-A Peach Bowl.

Professional career

Minnesota Vikings
On December 15, 2006, Henderson agreed to a five-year contract extension with the Vikings. The deal was reportedly worth over $25 million with $10 million guaranteed.

In April 2008, the Vikings signed Henderson's younger brother, Erin, as an undrafted free agent out of Maryland.

Henderson was placed on season-ending injured reserve after he dislocated multiple toes on October 6, 2008 in a game against the Tennessee Titans.

In Week 13 of the 2009 season, Henderson suffered a broken left femur during a game against the Arizona Cardinals. The injury occurred when his leg twisted violently as he was trying to tackle Tim Hightower and hit Jamarca Sanford's helmet.  He was removed from the field on a motorized cart, accompanied by his younger brother and teammate Erin.  Henderson stayed overnight in Phoenix for surgery, and missed the rest of the season. He made a full recovery in time for 2010 training camp.  After what was described as a "remarkable recovery", Henderson was selected for the 2011 Pro Bowl.

Career statistics
Source:

Personal life
He is the older brother of fellow former Vikings linebacker Erin Henderson, who also played college football of the Maryland Terrapins.

References

External links
 Minnesota Vikings bio

1980 births
Living people
All-American college football players
American football linebackers
Maryland Terrapins football players
Minnesota Vikings players
National Conference Pro Bowl players
People from Aberdeen, Maryland
People from Christian County, Kentucky
Players of American football from Maryland
Sportspeople from the Baltimore metropolitan area
Ed Block Courage Award recipients